Nothophryne broadleyi (common name: Broadley's mountain frog, mongrel frog) is a species of frog in the family Pyxicephalidae found on Mount Mulanje (Malawi). It was monotypic within the genus Nothophryne until four new species were described in 2018.

It is threatened by habitat loss caused by subsistence agriculture and extraction of wood. Also fires and invading exotic pines are threats.

Distribution and habitat
Nothophryne broadleyi is endemic to the mountains of southeastern Malawi where the mountains rise abruptly from the surrounding plain. It is abundant on Mount Mulanje in Malawi. It occurs in rocky areas in both montane forest and grassland.

Ecology
Nothophryne broadleyi breeds on wet rocks beside mountain streams. The eggs are laid on the soaked moss, and the young frogs eventually disperse across the rocks.

Status
The quality and extent of suitable habitat in the forests on Mount Mulanje is declining as wood is extracted from the forest and the land converted to subsistence farming. Other threats faced by the frogs are forest fires, and the planting of pine trees. The pines recover more quickly after a fire and gradually edge out the native vegetation. Populations of this frog are thought to be declining. For all these reasons, the International Union for Conservation of Nature has assessed this frog's conservation status as "endangered".

References

Pyxicephalidae
Frogs of Africa
Amphibians of Malawi
Amphibians of Mozambique
Amphibians described in 1963
Taxonomy articles created by Polbot